The 1983 New Mexico Lobos football team was an American football team that represented the University of New Mexico in the Western Athletic Conference (WAC) during the 1983 NCAA Division I-A football season.  In their first season under head coach Joe Lee Dunn, the Lobos compiled a 6–6 record (4–3 against WAC opponents) and outscored opponents by a total of 239 to 233. 

The team's statistical leaders included Buddy Funck with 1,521 passing yards, Michael Johnson with 739 rushing yards, Derwin Williams with 677 receiving yards, and kicker Joe Bibbo with 61 points scored.

Schedule

References

New Mexico
New Mexico Lobos football seasons
New Mexico Lobos football